Magma Geopark is the second Geopark to be designated in Norway, having gained membership of both the European Geoparks Network and Global Network of National Geoparks in 2010. In November 2016 UNESCO established the new International Geoscience and Geoparks Programme and the UNESCO Global Geopark are part of it. Magma Geopark has an area of 2,329 km² based on the largest layered intrusion and anorthosite area found in Europe and it is situated in southwest Norway in the municipalities of Bjerkreim, Eigersund, Flekkefjord, Lund and Sokndal.

1,500 million years ago, the region had a landscape of red-hot magma and high mountains. Through millions of years, glaciers helped to form the landscape we see in the area today. The main rock type is anorthosite, which is more common on the Moon than on the surface of the Earth.

Magma Geopark has several nature, cultural, historical and industrial attractions for both local visitors or tourists. The area has wide network routes and locations for outdoor activities, such as hiking, biking, climbing and kayaking.

References

External links
 official website of Magma Geopark
 Magma Geopark/Facebook
 Magma Geopark/Twitter
 Magma Geopark/Instagram
 Magma Geopark/Youtube
 Official website of the European Geoparks Network

Geoparks in Norway
Global Geoparks Network members